Rhinodoras is a genus of thorny catfishes native to South America.

Species 
There are currently five recognized species in this genus:
 Rhinodoras armbrusteri Sabaj Pérez, 2008
 Rhinodoras boehlkei Glodek, Whitmire & Orcés-V. (es), 1976
 Rhinodoras dorbignyi (Kner, 1855)
 Rhinodoras gallagheri Sabaj Pérez, Taphorn & Castillo G., 2008
 Rhinodoras thomersoni Taphorn & Lilyestrom, 1984

Fossil record
Rhinodoras has been identified in the fossil record from the late Miocene Urumaco Formation (about 9 million years of age), Falcón State, Venezuela. R. thomersoni may have a minimum age of 8 million years.

Appearance and anatomy
Rhinodoras species are distinguished from other doradids by a unique combination of coloration (sides darkly mottled, usually with wide dark bars, light mid-lateral stripe absent) and lip shape (labial tissue thick, fleshy, considerably expanded at corners of mouth forming rounded flap-like extensions with entire margins, all surfaces rugose with low, rounded, and tightly spaced papillae, and distal margin of lower lip draped over bases of outer and inner jaw barbels, at times nearly encircling the latter).

References

Doradidae
Fish of South America
Fish of the Amazon basin
Catfish genera
Taxa named by Pieter Bleeker
Freshwater fish genera